Ross Paustian (born March 3, 1956) is an American politician and a farmer from Iowa. Paustian is a Republican member of the Iowa House of Representatives for District 92 since 2015.

Early life 
On March 3, 1956, Paustian was born in Davenport, Iowa. Paustian's brother is Kent Paustian.

Education 
In 1978, Paustian earned a Bachelors of Science degree in Animal Science from South Dakota State University.

Career 
Paustian is a crop and livestock farmer.

On November 2, 2010, Paustian won the election and became a Republican member of Iowa House of Representatives for District 84. Paustian defeated Sheri L. Carnahan.

On November 6, 2012 Paustian was defeated by Frank D. Wood and lost his seat for District 92 with 47.6% of the votes.

On November 4, 2014, Paustian won the election and became a Republican member of the Iowa House of Representatives for District 92. Paustian defeated incumbent Frank D. Wood. On November 8, 2016, as an incumbent, Paustian won the election and continued serving District 92. Paustian defeated Ken Krumwiede with 56.13% of the votes. On November 6, 2018, as an incumbent, Paustian won the election and continued serving District 92. Paustian defeated Jean Simpson and other write-in with 52.5% of the votes.

Paustian is the chairman of the Agriculture Committee.

Awards 
 2015 Wergin Good Farm Neighbor award. Presented to the Paustian family by Iowa Secretary of Agriculture Bill Northey. (August 5, 2015).

Personal life 
Paustian's wife is Carol. They have two children, Jennifer and Thomas.

References

External links 
 Ross C. Paustian at ballotpedia.org
 Ross Paustian at legis.iowa.gov

1956 births
Farmers from Iowa
Living people
South Dakota State University alumni
Republican Party members of the Iowa House of Representatives
21st-century American politicians